Delvaux  is a surname. Notable people with the surname include: 

 Albert Delvaux (1918–1985), Congolese politician
 André Delvaux (1926–2002), Belgian film director
 Anne Delvaux (born 1970), Belgian politician
 Berthe di Vito-Delvaux (1915–2005), Belgian composer
 Henry Delvaux de Fenffe, Belgian politician
 Jean Delvaux (died 1595), Belgian Roman Catholic monk
 Laurent Delvaux (1696–1778), Flemish sculptor
 Paul Delvaux (1897–1994), Belgian painter

Other
 Delvaux (company) Belgian manufacturer of fine leather luxury goods
 1848 Delvaux, main-belt asteroid